The Niaceae are a family of fungi in the order Agaricales. The family contains six genera and 56 species. GBIF (in 2022), accepted 10 genera and 278 species.

Genera
 Cyphellopsis  (3)
 Dendrothele (64)
 Flagelloscypha (50)
 Halocyphina  (2)
 Lachnella  (112)
 Maireina  (27)
 Merismodes  (13)
 Nia  (4) 
 Sphaerobasidioscypha  (1)
 Woldmaria (2)

Note :Figures in brackets show amounts of species in each genera.

See also
 List of Agaricales families

References

External links

 
Basidiomycota families